"White Lies" is a single by Jason & the Scorchers. Produced by Terry Manning, it was the second track on their 1985 album, Lost and Found. "White Lies" was released by EMI America, on 12-inch vinyl.

Track listing

A1. "White Lies"
B1. "Are You Ready For The Country"
B2. "Honky Tonk Blues"

References

1985 singles
1985 songs
EMI America Records singles
Song articles with missing songwriters